Eddie S. Glaude Jr. (born September 4, 1968) is an American academic. He is the James S. McDonnell Distinguished University Professor of African American Studies at Princeton University, where he is also the Chair of the Center for African American Studies and the Chair of the Department of African American Studies. As a public intellectual committed to American pragmatism and trained in the tradition of James Baldwin and Ralph Waldo Emerson, Glaude aims to think pragmatically about African American life and more broadly, to think philosophically about questions surrounding identity, agency, and history.

His most recent book Begin Again: James Baldwin's America and Its Urgent Lessons for Our Own won the 2021 Stowe Prize.

Early life and education
Glaude was born in 1968 in Moss Point, Mississippi into a working-class family. His mother was a shipyard custodian who later served as the team's supervisor, while his father was a postman. He was raised at St Peter's Apostolic Catholic Church in Pascagoula, a parish administered by the Josephites. At 15 years old, Glaude became the first Black Youth Governor of Mississippi. This opportunity was awarded to him through a YMCA program in Mississippi that invited students to the state capitol for a couple of days to assist in the duties of running the state government. In 1984, Glaude went to San Francisco to be a part of the Mississippi Democratic Party at the Democratic National Convention. Here he got the opportunity to meet Jesse Jackson and Mario Coumo.

Glaude graduated from high school at age 16 and in 1989 received his bachelor's degree from Morehouse College, where he served as the Student Government President. While an undergraduate student, Glaude encountered theology and Black nationalist politics and his passion for politics expanded. After taking a philosophy class with Dr. Aaron L. Parker, Glaude was inspired to pursue a career in academia. After graduating from Morehouse, Glaude earned a master's degree in African-American studies from Temple University and afterwards a Ph.D. in religion from Princeton University. Within the Department of Religion, Glaude specialized in the subfield of religion, ethics, and politics. He sees these three fields as intertwined as they collectively shape aspects of political life and views of democracy. Glaude was also a founding member and senior fellow of the Jamestown Project. In 2015, Glaude received an honorary doctor of human letters from Colgate University.

He and his wife, the former Winnifred Brown, have a son, Langston.

Career

Academic 
Glaude began his teaching career at Bowdoin College where he served as chair of the Department of Religion. Six years after, Cornel West's return to Princeton led him to join the university's teaching staff. Throughout his academic career, Glaude has received numerous awards including the Carl A. Fields Award, and was a visiting scholar in African-American Studies at Harvard University and Amherst College. His first academic publication, Exodus! Religion, Race, and Nation in Early 19th Century Black America, won the Modern Language Association's William Sanders Scarborough Book Prize. His most recent book, Begin Again: James Baldwin's America and Its Urgent Lessons for Our Own won the 2021 Stowe Prize.

Media Presence 
Glaude is passionate about the media because he sees this institution as playing a key role in maintaining a healthy democracy. Through his media appearances, Glaude seeks to inject complexity, nuance, and passion to discussions surrounding present-day circumstances. As a scholar trained in the tradition of Baldwin and Emerson, he aims for those around him to think more imaginatively and creatively about such circumstances. In the time spent thinking carefully in public with others, he seeks to model habits of careful listening, thoughtfulness, seriousness, and sincerity.

In 2007, Glaude delivered the Founder's Day Convocation keynote address during the 140th anniversary of Morehouse College. In 2010, Glaude published The Black Church is Dead in the Huffington Post, where he argues that the role of the Black church has changed throughout time as Black members have increasingly integrated into white communities. Up until Tavis Smiley halted the event in 2010, Glaude served as a regular contributor and panelist for the annual State of the Black Union. The State of the Black Union was Glaude's first time where he engaged in conversations about the state of Black America in front of a national audience. These media appearances drew much attention from the public, resulting in his fame and news coverage increasing substantially in the years to come.

Glaude is now best known for his appearances on The Tavis Smiley Show, Fox News' Hannity & Colmes Show, CNN, MSNBC, C-SPAN, and NBC Meet the Press. Along with Cornel West and Michael Eric Dyson, he also appeared in the documentary Stand, produced and directed by Tavis Smiley. He currently serves as a contributor to the Huffington Post.

Teaching at Princeton 
At Princeton University, Glaude primarily teaches two undergraduate level courses, both within the Department of African American Studies. “Topics in African American Studies: The Fire This Time - James Baldwin” is a seminar style course where students closely examine a selection of Baldwin's non-fiction writings and consider the intellectual's reflections on race and democracy. Glaude also teaches “African American Studies and the Philosophy of Race,” a lecture style class that serves as an introduction to the discipline of African American studies. Students in the course read classic texts in African American thought and practice that offer insights into (1) the complex experiences, both past and present, of Americans of African descent and (2) the ways in which individuals come to know and experience race in the United States. Beyond teaching under-graduate level courses, Glaude also advises a select number of students majoring in African American Studies on their senior theses.

Works

 

An Uncommon Faith: A Pragmatic Approach to the Study of African American Religion. The University of Georgia Press. 15 November 2018. ISBN 978-0-8203-5417-0

Intellectual contributions from his published works 
Eddie Glaude's intellectual work accounts for the modern explanations of white supremacy and the formation of Black Power movements, making references to slavery and histories of white dominance. As Glaude argues throughout his bodies of work, anti-Blackness and white supremacy continue to structure American society as a result of the Value Gap, in which white lives are valued more than Black lives, impacting many of the political decisions in the United States. Black identity and Black Power Movements arise in response to and are emphasized because of the increasing expressions of white supremacy. His work also reveals the importance of African American religion, which encompasses a range of religious doctrines, in that it serves as an avenue to respond to oppressive conditions and varying forms of institutional discrimination African Americans face. Importantly, African American religion is intrinsically linked to Black identity, thus highlighting the linkages between politics and religion. The remaining part of this section describes Glaude's top-five selling books in more detail.

Books

In a shade of blue : pragmatism and the politics of Black America 
Throughout this book, Eddie Glaude uses African American stories and novels, specifically Toni Morrison's book Beloved and John Dewey's ethnographies, to define racial identity and construct a concept of African American politics. Glaude claims the way African Americans are treated reflects how society continues to define the future using the past instead of the present. Glaude references Apartheid in South Africa and slavery in the United States as two historic examples of where institutionalized racism that continues to affect the present. Alongside these histories, he emphasizes Black power and the need for Black political leaders to recognize African American history. Acknowledging this history will make it easier to work towards a successful future for all African Americans.

Exodus!: religion, race, and nation in early nineteenth-century Black America 
This book is Eddie Glaude's first academic publication. Here, Glaude explains Black religious life played an important role in the development of a Black national identity. References to the Exodus story specifically, aided in the crafting of a national identity that reflected the unique experience of African Americans. Black interpretations of the Exodus story helped frame African Americans as a separate community of people and rather than completely rejecting the United States, African Americans used this story to call for racial solidarity. Glaude also argues Black religion and the workings of political organizations of Black Americans are linked. Scholars praised Exodus! for expanding information on racial and religious discourses during the antebellum period and for introducing new concepts that can be used to discuss Black religion in public spaces.

Democracy in black: How race still enslaves the American soul 
This book is Glaude's first trade book. Here he describes the state of black America that savages the idea of a post-racial society.

Glaude talks about America's great promise of equality and how it has always “rung hollow” in the ears of African Americans. The situation of equality has become more serious due to the murders of black youth by the police, the dismantling of the Voting Rights Act, and the disaster visited upon poor and middle-class black families by the Great Recession. Glaude claims it is clear that Black America faces an emergency—at the very moment the election of the first Black president has prompted many to believe we have solved America's race problem though African-Americans have lost more than 50 percent of their wealth by 2011. They lost homes, savings, and jobs, with national black unemployment reaching 16 percent in 2010.

In his book, Eddie S. Glaude Jr.’s impassioned response argues that we live in a country founded on a “value gap”—with white lives valued more than others—that still distorts our politics today. Whether discussing why all Americans have racial habits that reinforce inequality, why black politics based on the civil-rights era have reached a dead end, or why only remaking democracy from the ground up can bring real change, Glaude crystallizes the untenable position of Black America–and offers thoughts on a better way forward. Forceful in ideas and unsettling in its candor, Democracy In Blackis a landmark book on race in America, one that promises to spark wide discussion as we move toward the end of our first black presidency.

In An Uncommon Faith : A Pragmatic Approach to the Study of African American Religion 
Eddie Glaude analyzes the relationship that African Americans have with religion. Glaude focuses on Black religious attitudes and looks at how these attitudes tie the Black community together. He argues that if one wants to understand Black life within America, one must study and pay attention to African American religion. The book is made up of three chapters that explain the role religion has played within African American history. While discussing African American religion, Glaude touches upon Black migration, racial authenticity, and moral community while also examining W.E.B. DuBois's thoughts on African American religion. Glaude also focus on Black souls and how they try to navigate and find identity in white society.

African American Religion : A Very Short Introduction 
Since the inception of the first fully African American denomination was established in Philadelphia in 1818, churches have played a role in communities as much more than spiritual guidance. These churches have played the role of a home; places where, civic institutions, spaces for education, and sites for the cultivation of individuality and identities in the face of limited or non-existent freedom. In African American Religion : A Very Short Introduction, Eddie Glaude explores and analyzes the history of African American religion throughout the years. Glaude uses three examples: conjure, African American Christianity, and African American Islam. Glaude uses the term “African American religion” to exemplify the struggles African Americans have faced since they were enslaved; African Americans have used religion in response to oppressive conditions including slavery, Jim Crow apartheid, and the pervasive and institutionalized discrimination that exists today. Several of his claims throughout the book lay the framework for his interpretation of the wide diversity of religions among the African American community.

Interviews, Lectures and Media Appearances

2006-2007 
Eddie Glaude's main appearances in 2006 and 2007 were on State of the Black Union presented by Tavis Smiley. Both years on the show, Eddie Glaude presented concepts focusing on how older generations can spread awareness of black culture and the historic oppression that past black generations have faced. Glaude points to the importance of educating younger generations on African-American history education since this will teach them to ask questions about the past and because they are the future that will form how society functions. Glaude's media coverage in 2007 centered around his newly published book, In a Shade of Blue.

2008-2010 
During this time period Eddie Glaude was on the State of the Black Union with Tavis Smiley, bringing up questions about the right way to diagnose the “storm and chaos” Black people face currently, even with the advancements that have been made socially for them. He also advocates for politics to be fixed from local to the national level in order for Black people to have more of a voice. Glaude comments on African-American religion as well and questions whether we should look at Africa as the central root. He talks about how Black identity is the product of principle for struggle as they are the motivation for that struggle. Finally, Glaude argues who we take ourselves to be and how we understand ourselves as moral agents often guides how we engage in politics and in that same vein, the sorts of choices we make while engaging in politics fundamentally shape who we take ourselves to be.

2011-2013 
During 2011–2013, Glaude lectured at the Lutheran Philadelphia Seminary (LTSP) and participated in a panel discussion at the 2013 Harlem Book Fair. In both appearances he talks about African American identity, African American religion, political activism, and the ideal of American democracy. He also references African American churches and religious discourses as central to giving voice to the political demands of African Americans. In his 2011 lecture at the LTSP, Glaude address the idea that America is an example of democracy achieved. He sees this idea as insidious because it perpetuates the belief that America is incapable of wrong. At the 2013 Harlem Book Fair panel discussion he discusses the current state of the Black church and claims it has become decentralized as the most important institutional space for Black Americans.

2014-2015 
During this time, Eddie Glaude appears in a scholarly discussion at The Center for African American Studies at Princeton University in December 2014. Glaude intervenes in a long dialogue with Cornel West about what it means to be a Black intellectual in the context of a neoliberal academy. They talk about the presence of the Black Church and the leadership it plays in the Black community where it creates community and conversation for Black people. They go on to talk about their own presences in the eyes of white liberals. West brings up Paul Robeson, W.E.B DuBois, and James Baldwin in how they pushed the margins of thought. They shed light on when Robeson, DuBois, and Baldwin's time as when Black studies were achieving a level of institutional presence.

2016-2019 
Eddie Glaude's main appearances in 2016 and 2017 were on Democracy Now. While on Democracy Now, Eddie Glaude mainly talks about his views on the upcoming 2016 presidential election. In his appearances Glaude mentions that he is not a fan of neither Donald Trump nor Hillary Clinton. One appearance in particular featured his son, Langston, where they discussed the “value gap” that plagues America as well as the presidential election between Clinton and Trump. Glaude and his son recommend those not living in key battle ground states to leave the ballots blank as a symbol that the American people are not going to accept the given status quo. In 2017, Glaude mainly discusses what Obama’s legacy is and he also makes appearances on NBC’s Meet the Press where he analyzes Trump’s inaugural year in office.

Starting in 2018, Glaude started to make regular appearances on MSNBC, where he primarily contributed to conversations surrounding the rise of Trumpism. Glaude critiques Trump for his lack of a cohesive plan, spread of false information, and neglect of working and middle classes. He analyzes the impeachment process, what aftermath may look like, and why Donald Trump should be impeached.

2020-present 
In early 2020, Glaude's MSNBC appearances addressed the onset of the COVID-19 pandemic and how the Trump administration failed Americans in its response to the pandemic. Once Joe Biden was inaugurated as the 46th President of the United States, Glaude began to comment on how the Biden administration was addressing immigration, police militarization, the rise of mass shootings, and life in a post-pandemic world. Other media appearances discussed his New York Times Bestselling Book Begin Again and Democracy in Black.

Between 2020 and now, Glaude has also visited universities across the United States where he offers lectures, gives commencement speeches, and participates in panel discussions or conferences. These appearances center around critical race theory, identity politics, white “mob” violence, contemporary discrimination, race, class, and the importance of education for Black and brown people. Topics Glaude has discussed in panel discussions at book festivals and museums, interviews, and podcast episodes include the history of Black leadership, nuclear threats, allegations of Trump inciting the January 6th plot, civil rights movements, artists and intellectuals that have helped inform his work, racial gaslighting in the NFL, and the American electorate during election cycles.

Filmography 

 Stand (2009)
 Problema (2010)
 PBS NewsHour
 MSNBC Live

References

External links

The Jamestown Project
Department of Religion, Princeton University

1968 births
Living people
Black studies scholars
Bowdoin College faculty
Princeton University faculty
Morehouse College alumni
Temple University alumni
Princeton University alumni
African-American Catholics